Ksenia Poliakova (born 25 August 2000) is a Russian group rhythmic gymnast.

Gold medal at the European Championships 2016 in group exercises.

References

External links
 

Living people
2000 births
Sportspeople from Samara, Russia
Russian rhythmic gymnasts
Medalists at the Rhythmic Gymnastics European Championships
Medalists at the Rhythmic Gymnastics World Championships
21st-century Russian women